Fastnet Lighthouse is a  lighthouse situated on the remote Fastnet Rock in the Atlantic Ocean. The current lighthouse is the second to be built on the rock and is the tallest in Ireland.

First lighthouse
Construction of the first lighthouse began in 1853, and it first produced a light on 1 January 1854. The lighthouse replaced an early one built on Cape Clear Island in 1818, partly motivated by the loss of an American sailing packet, Stephen Whitney, in thick fog during November 1847 on nearby West Calf Island causing the death of 92 of her 110 passengers and crew. The new lighthouse was constructed of cast iron with an inner lining of brick and was designed by George Halpin. It had an oil-burning lamp of 38 kilocandelas; in contrast, modern lighthouses typically produce 1,300 kilocandelas. In 1883 an explosive fog signal was installed, which electrically detonated a small charge of guncotton every five minutes.

Various steps were taken to strengthen the tower, including fitting a casing around the bottom section up to the second floor and filling it with stone, and the surrounding rock smoothed over. In 1865 the lower floors were filled in with solid material.

Second lighthouse
In 1891 the Commissioners of Irish Lights had resolved that the light was not sufficiently powerful, particularly for the first landfall for many ships crossing the Atlantic. The replacement was constructed of stone, cast iron now being considered unsatisfactory – the whole of the nearby Calf tower above its strengthening casing had been carried away during a gale on 27 November 1881, although without loss of life. On the same day, the sea had broken the glass of the Fastnet Rock lantern.

The new lighthouse was designed by William Douglass and built under the supervision of James Kavanagh. Construction started in 1897 with the levelling of the site, and the first of 2,047 dovetailed blocks of Cornish granite was laid in June 1899. The new lighthouse entered service on 27 June 1904, having cost nearly £90,000.

The first floor of the original tower remains, on the highest part of the rock, having been left when it was demolished and converted into an oil store.

The fog signal was changed to one report every three minutes in 1934, and from 1965 accompanied by a brilliant flash when operated during darkness. The original vaporised paraffin light was replaced with an electric one on 10 May 1969. At the end of March 1989, the lighthouse was converted to automatic operation. It is monitored and controlled using a UHF telemetry link to Mizen Head Lighthouse in County Cork, and onwards by landline to the Irish Lights control centre at Dún Laoghaire.

Since April 1978 in addition to being operated during darkness, the light is also used during poor visibility. Following a review of navigational aids, the fog signal was permanently shut down on 11 January 2011. The Racon (radar transponder beacon) has transmitted the Morse code for the letter G since its installation in 1994.

This is an Irish record, based on measurements going back to the 1860s.

Fastnet Rock

Fastnet Rock or simply Fastnet (possibly ). Fastnet is known as "Ireland's Teardrop", because it was the last part of Ireland that 19th-century Irish emigrants saw as they sailed to North America.

Fastnet also gives its name to the sea area used by the Shipping Forecasts transmitted by the BBC.

Fastnet Rock is used as the midpoint of one of the world's classic offshore yachting races, the Fastnet Race, a  round-trip from Cowes on the Isle of Wight, around the rock and back to Plymouth (from 2021 onwards, back to Cherbourg in France). It is also sometimes used as a mark for yacht races from local sailing centres such as Schull, Baltimore, and Crookhaven.

See also

"Carraig Aonair (The Lone Rock)" folksong about a disaster on the rock.
List of lighthouses in Ireland
List of islands of Ireland

References

Sources
 Morrissey, James (2005). A History of Fastnet Lighthouse. Columbia Press. 
 The Fastnet Lighthouse: Light on a lonely rock, The Economist 18 Dec 2008
 C.W. Scott, History of Fastnet Lighthouses, Schull Books 2001
 R. Coates, 'Fastnet', Nomina 20 (1997), pp. 37–46
 Fastnet Lighthouse Vital Statistics 
 Pictures of the lighthouse
 Mizen Head Signal Station
 9/28/1907;Fastnet Rock Lighthouses As Seen From Ooean Liners

External links

 Fastnet Rock Commissioners of Irish Lights
 Fastnet Rock Tour from Baltimore and Cape Clear Island
 Fastnet Construction 

Lighthouses completed in 1853
Lighthouses completed in 1892
Towers completed in 1891
Lighthouses in the Republic of Ireland
Tourist attractions in County Cork
Lighthouses on the National Inventory of Architectural Heritage